In mathematics, a frieze or frieze pattern is a two-dimensional design that repeats in one direction. Such patterns occur frequently in architecture and decorative art. Frieze patterns can be classified into seven types according to their symmetries. The set of symmetries of a frieze pattern is called a frieze group.

Frieze groups are two-dimensional line groups, having repetition in only one direction.  They are related to the more complex wallpaper groups, which classify patterns that are repetitive in two directions, and crystallographic groups, which classify patterns that are repetitive in three directions.

General

Formally, a frieze group is a class of infinite discrete symmetry groups of patterns on a strip (infinitely wide rectangle), hence a class of groups of isometries of the plane, or of a strip.  A symmetry group of a frieze group necessarily contains translations and may contain glide reflections, reflections along the long axis of the strip, reflections along the narrow axis of the strip, and 180° rotations.  There are seven frieze groups, listed in the summary table.    Many authors present the frieze groups in a different order.

The actual symmetry groups within a frieze group are characterized by the smallest translation distance, and, for the frieze groups with vertical line reflection or 180° rotation (groups 2, 5, 6, and 7), by a shift parameter locating the reflection axis or point of rotation. In the case of symmetry groups in the plane, additional parameters are the direction of the translation vector, and,  for the frieze groups with horizontal line reflection, glide reflection, or 180° rotation (groups 3–7), the position of the reflection axis or rotation point in the direction perpendicular to the translation vector. Thus there are two degrees of freedom for group 1, three for groups 2, 3, and 4, and four for groups 5, 6, and 7.

For two of the seven frieze groups (groups 1 and 4) the symmetry groups are singly generated, for four (groups 2, 3, 5, and 6) they have a pair of generators, and for group 7 the symmetry groups require three generators.  A symmetry group in frieze group 1, 2, 3, or 5 is a subgroup of a symmetry group in the last frieze group with the same translational distance. A symmetry group in frieze group 4 or 6  is a subgroup of a symmetry group in the last frieze group with half the translational distance. This last frieze group contains the symmetry groups of the simplest periodic patterns in the strip (or the plane), a row of dots.  Any transformation of the plane leaving this pattern invariant can be decomposed into a translation, optionally followed by a reflection in either the horizontal axis, or the vertical axis, provided that this axis is chosen through or midway between two dots, or a rotation by 180°,  (ditto).  Therefore, in a way, this frieze group contains the "largest" symmetry groups, which consist of all such transformations.

The inclusion of the discrete condition is to exclude the group containing all translations, and groups containing arbitrarily small translations (e.g. the group of horizontal translations by rational distances). Even apart from scaling and shifting, there are infinitely many cases, e.g. by considering rational numbers of which the denominators are powers of a given prime number.

The inclusion of the infinite condition is to exclude groups that have no translations:
the group with the identity only (isomorphic to C1, the trivial group of order 1).
the group consisting of the identity and reflection in the horizontal axis (isomorphic to C2, the cyclic group of order 2).
the groups each consisting of the identity and reflection in a vertical axis (ditto)
the groups each consisting of the identity and 180° rotation about a point on the horizontal axis (ditto)
the groups each consisting of the identity, reflection in a vertical axis, reflection in the horizontal axis, and 180° rotation about the point of intersection (isomorphic to the Klein four-group)

Descriptions of the seven frieze groups
There are seven distinct subgroups (up to scaling and shifting of patterns) in the discrete frieze group generated by a translation, reflection (along the same axis) and a 180° rotation. Each of these subgroups is the symmetry group of a frieze pattern, and sample patterns are shown in Fig. 1. The seven different groups correspond to the 7 infinite series of axial point groups in three dimensions, with n = ∞.

They are identified in the table below using Hermann–Mauguin notation (or IUC notation), Coxeter notation, Schönflies notation,  orbifold notation, nicknames created by mathematician John H. Conway, and finally a description in terms of translation, reflections and rotations.

Of the seven frieze groups, there are only four up to isomorphism.

Lattice types: Oblique and rectangular
The groups can be classified by their type of two-dimensional grid or lattice. The lattice being oblique means that the second direction need not be orthogonal to the direction of repeat.

See also
Symmetry groups in one dimension
Line group
Rod group
Wallpaper group
Space group

Web demo and software

There exist software graphic tools that create 2D patterns using frieze groups. Usually, the entire pattern is updated automatically in response to edits of the original strip.
 EscherSketch A free online program for drawing, saving, and exporting tessellations.  Supports all wallpaper groups.
 Kali, a free and open source software application for wallpaper, frieze and other patterns.
 Kali , free downloadable Kali for Windows and Mac Classic.
 Tess, a nagware tessellation program for multiple platforms, supports all wallpaper, frieze, and rosette groups, as well as Heesch tilings.
 FriezingWorkz, a freeware Hypercard stack for the Classic Mac platform that supports all frieze groups.

References

External links
 Frieze Patterns at cut-the-knot
 Illuminations: Frieze Patterns

Euclidean symmetries
Discrete groups